Tukay may refer to:
Ğabdulla Tuqay (1886–1913), Tatar poet
Tukay, Republic of Tatarstan, a settlement in the Republic of Tatarstan, Russia
Tukay, name of several other rural localities in Russia